Struck Oil is a rural locality in the Rockhampton Region, Queensland, Australia.

History 
The place was named after the play Struck Oil.

Struck Oil Provisional School opened in 1905. On 1 March 1911, it became Struck Oil State School. It closed circa 1944.

Education 
There are no schools in Struck Oil. The nearest primary schools are in neighbouring Bouldercombe and Mount Morgan. The nearest secondary school is in Mount Morgan.

References

Suburbs of Rockhampton Region
Localities in Queensland